Amine oxidase (copper-containing) (AOC) ( and ; formerly ) is a family of amine oxidase enzymes which includes both primary-amine oxidase and diamine oxidase; these enzymes catalyze the oxidation of a wide range of biogenic amines including many neurotransmitters, histamine and xenobiotic amines. They act as a disulphide-linked homodimer. They catalyse the oxidation of primary amines to aldehydes, with the subsequent release of ammonia and hydrogen peroxide, which requires one copper ion per subunit and topaquinone as cofactor:

RCH2NH2 + H2O + O2  RCHO + NH3 + H2O2

The 3 substrates of this enzyme are primary amines (RCH2NH2), H2O, and O2, whereas its 3 products are RCHO, NH3, and H2O2.

Copper-containing amine oxidases are found in bacteria, fungi, plants and animals. In prokaryotes, the enzyme enables various amine substrates to be used as sources of carbon and nitrogen.

This enzyme belongs to oxidoreductases, specifically those acting on the CH-NH2 group of donors with oxygen as acceptor.  The systematic name of this enzyme class is amine:oxygen oxidoreductase (deaminating) (copper-containing).  This enzyme participates in 8 metabolic pathways: urea cycle and metabolism of amino groups, glycine, serine and threonine metabolism, histidine metabolism, tyrosine metabolism, phenylalanine metabolism, tryptophan metabolism, beta-alanine metabolism, and alkaloid biosynthesis ii.  It has 2 cofactors: copper,  and PQQ.

Structure 
The copper amine oxidase 3-dimensional structure was determined through X-ray crystallography.
The copper amine oxidases occur as mushroom-shaped homodimers of 70-95 kDa, each monomer containing a copper ion and a covalently bound redox cofactor, topaquinone (TPQ). TPQ is formed by post-translational modification of a conserved tyrosine residue. The copper ion is coordinated with three histidine residues and two water molecules in a distorted square pyramidal geometry, and has a dual function in catalysis and TPQ biogenesis. The catalytic domain is the largest of the 3-4 domains found in copper amine oxidases, and consists of a beta sandwich of 18 strands in two sheets. The active site is buried and requires a conformational change to allow the substrate access.

The N2 and N3 N-terminal domains share a common structural fold, its core consisting of alpha-beta(4), where the helix is packed against the coiled anti-parallel beta-sheets. An additional domain is found at the N-terminal of some copper amine oxidases, as well as in related proteins such as cell wall hydrolase and N-acetylmuramoyl-L-alanine amidase. This domain consists of a five-stranded antiparallel beta-sheet twisted around an alpha helix.

Function
In eukaryotes they have a broader range of functions, including cell differentiation and growth, wound healing, detoxification and cell signalling; one AOC enzyme (AOC3) functions as a vascular adhesion protein (VAP-1) in some mammalian tissues.

Human proteins containing this domain
AOC1
AOC2
AOC3

See also
 Copper in health

References

Further reading 

 
 
 Boyer, P.D., Lardy, H. and Myrback, K. (Eds.), The Enzymes, 2nd ed., vol. 8, Academic Press, New York, 1963, p. 337-351.
 
 
 
 
 
 
 
 Boyer, P.D., Lardy, H. and Myrback, K. (Eds.), The Enzymes, 2nd ed., vol. 8, Academic Press, New York, 1963, p. 313-335.

EC 1.4.3
Copper enzymes
Pyrroloquinoline quinone enzymes
Enzymes of known structure